Kaydion Gabriel (born 1 December 1990 in Trinidad and Tobago) is a Trinidadian footballer.

Career

Able to operate as a defender, midfielder, winger, or forward, Gabriel was nicknamed "Drogba" after the Ivory Coast international Didier Drogba by his teammates.

Gabriel won 3 Trinidadian top flight titles in a row with Central, in 2014/14, 2015/16, and 2016/17.

References

External links

 Kaydion Gabriel at Soccerway

Trinidad and Tobago footballers
Association football forwards
Association football wingers
Association football midfielders
Association football defenders
Living people
1990 births
Trinidad and Tobago international footballers